Otwaya is a genus of fungi within the Hyaloscyphaceae family. This is a monotypic genus, containing the single species Otwaya verruculospora.

References

External links
Otwaya at Index Fungorum

Hyaloscyphaceae
Monotypic Leotiomycetes genera